George Owen Marsh (born 5 November 1998) is an English professional footballer who plays as a midfielder for AFC Wimbledon.

Early and personal life
Marsh was born in Pembury, Kent, and raised in Hawkhurst, attending Robertsbridge Community College.

Career

Tottenham Hotspur 
Marsh joined the Tottenham Hotspur Academy in 2015. After making 4 appearances for the U21 team in the EFL Trophy at the start of the 2018–19 season, he made his senior debut on 4 January 2019 in the FA Cup against Tranmere Rovers. He extended his contract with Tottenham for two more years in June 2019.

On 19 August 2019, Marsh went on loan to Leyton Orient until January 2020. The deal was extended until the end of the 2019–20 season on 6 January 2020. Tottenham announced that Marsh will be released by the club at the end of the 2020–21 season.

AFC Wimbledon 

On 6 July 2021, Marsh joined League One side AFC Wimbledon on a free transfer.

Playing style
Marsh has been described by Tottenham Hotspur as "a tenacious, tough-tackling holding midfielder who can also play in the back line".

Career statistics

References

1998 births
Living people
English footballers
Tottenham Hotspur F.C. players
Leyton Orient F.C. players
Association football midfielders
English Football League players
People from Pembury
AFC Wimbledon players